Mingyu may refer to:
 Chen Mingyu, Chinese name of Maxima Chan Zuckerberg
 Lin Mingyu (1937–2019), Chinese politician
 Ma Mingyu (born 1970), Chinese International footballer
 Zhang Mingyu (born 2001), female Chinese modern pentathlete
 Zhao Mingyu (born 1997), Chinese footballer